This is a list of candidates for the 1935 New South Wales state election. The election was held on 11 May 1935.

Retiring members

Labor
 William Brennan (Hamilton)
 Peter Connolly (Newcastle) — lost party endorsement
 Tom Keegan (Glebe)

United Australia
 Sir Thomas Henley (Burwood)

Legislative Assembly
Sitting members are shown in bold text. Successful candidates are highlighted in the relevant colour.

See also
 Members of the New South Wales Legislative Assembly, 1935–1938

References
 

1935